Live for Live is Ana Popović's third concert video and live album, recorded during the Festival de Guitares d'Issoudun in Issoudun, France, at the Centre Culturel Albert Camus on November 2, 2019 and released on May 15, 2020. Popović's touring band of consisted of  bassist Buthel, keyboarder Michele Papadia, drummer Jerry Kelley, saxophonist Claudio Giovagnoli, and trumpeter Davide Ghidoni

Video track list

Video personnel

Musicians
 Ana Popović – vocals, guitar
 Buthel Burns – bass, backing vocals
 Michele Papadia – keys
 Jerry Kelley – drums, backing vocals
 Claudio Giovagnoli – saxophone
 Davide Ghidoni – trumpet

Video production by Cap 7 Media
 Pascal Guilly - live director
 Philippe Lecomte - vision engineer, equipment manager
 Philippe Laurent - technical assistant
 Olivier Thillou - sound engineer
 Rémi Legay - motorized camera operator
 Jérome Beauvarlet - camera operator 1
 Damien Claite - camera operator 2
 Alexandre Barre - camera operator
 Clément Lelong - crane operator

Technical team of the Centre Culturel Albert Camus
 Hervé Pépion - director
 Christophe Canon - technical director, lighting creation
 Bruno Robin - régie Son FOH
 Maël Vogel - sound assistant
 Fred Imbert - régie lumiére, lighting creation
 Alice Leclerc - régie lumiére assistant
 Jean-Marc Verdier - his monitors

DVD production
 Jason Wishnow - video editor
 Misha Kachkachishvili (Esplanade Studios) - mixing
 Dave Gardner (Infrasonic Sound) - mastering
 Stéphane Kerrad (KB Studios, Paris) - artwork & design
 Ruben Tomas (FD Studios, Los Angeles) - photography
 Nicole Wittman - makeup

Album track list

The physical CD release of the album has a shortened track list.

Album personnel

Musicians
 Ana Popović – vocals, guitar
 Buthel Burns – bass, backing vocals
 Michele Papadia – keys
 Jerry Kelley – drums, backing vocals
 Claudio Giovagnoli – saxophone
 Davide Ghidoni – trumpet

CD production
 Misha Kachkachishvili (Esplanade Studios) - mixing
 Dave Gardner (Infrasonic Sound) - mastering
 Stéphane Kerrad (KB Studios, Paris) - artwork & design
 Ruben Tomas (FD Studios, Los Angeles) - photography
 Nicole Wittman - makeup

References

2020 live albums
Ana Popović albums
Live video albums